Complex text layout (CTL) or complex text rendering is the typesetting of writing systems in which the shape or positioning of a grapheme depends on its relation to other graphemes. The term is used in the field of software internationalization, where each grapheme is a character.

Scripts which require CTL for proper display may be known as complex scripts. Examples include the Arabic alphabet and scripts of the Brahmic family, such as Devanagari, Khmer script or the Thai alphabet. Many scripts do not require CTL. For instance, the Latin alphabet or Chinese characters can be typeset by simply displaying each character one after another in straight rows or columns. However, even these scripts have alternate forms or optional features (such as cursive writing) which require CTL to produce on computers.

Characteristics requiring CTL
The main characteristics of CTL complexity are:
 Bi-directional text, where characters may be written from either right-to-left or left-to-right direction.
 Context-sensitive shaping and ligatures, where a character may change its shape, dependent on its location and/or the surrounding characters. For example, a character in Arabic script can have as many as four different shape-forms, depending on context.
 Ordering, where the displayed order of the characters is not the same as the logical order. For example, in Devanagari, which is written from left to right, the grapheme for "short i" appears to the left of ("before") the consonant that it follows: in  ki, the  -i should render on the left, its bow reaching until above the  k- to the right.

Not all occurrences of these characteristics require CTL. For example, the Greek alphabet has context-sensitive shaping of the letter sigma, which appears as ς at the end of a word and σ elsewhere. For collation and comparison purposes, software should consider the string "δῖος Ἀχιλλεύς" equivalent to "δῖοσ Ἀχιλλεύσ", but for typesetting purposes they are distinct and CTL is not required to choose the correct form.

Implementations

Most text-rendering software that is capable of CTL will include information about specific scripts, and so will be able to render them correctly without font files needing to supply instructions on how to lay out characters. Such software is usually provided in a library; examples include:
 Core Text for macOS
 Uniscribe (with Universal Shaping Engine) and DirectWrite for Microsoft Windows
 HarfBuzz, a cross-platform library
 Pango, a cross-platform library which nowadays incorporates HarfBuzz

However, such software is unable to properly render any script for which it lacks instructions, which can include many minority scripts. The alternative approach is to include the rendering instructions in the font file itself. Rendering software still needs to be capable of reading and following the instructions, but this is relatively simple.

Examples of this latter approach include Apple Advanced Typography (AAT) and Graphite. Both of these names encompass both the instruction format and the software supporting it; AAT is included on Apple operating systems, while Graphite is available for Microsoft Windows and Linux-based systems.

The OpenType format is primarily intended for systems using the first approach (layout knowledge in the renderer, not the font), but it has a few features that assist with CTL, such as contextual ligatures. AAT and Graphite instructions can be embedded in OpenType font files.

See also
 Typography
 Unicode
 Writing systems which require complex text layout:
 Arabic alphabet
 Most of the Brahmic family of scripts
 N'Ko script
 Tengwar (diacritics and numbers)

References

External links
 Examples of complex rendering — SIL international's examples of complex writing systems around the world
 Complex Text Layout — The Open Group's Desktop Technologies
 Supporting Indic Scripts in Mozilla — also other CTL scripts
 Project SILA — Graphite and Mozilla integration project
 CTL Architecture in Solaris — Solaris Globalization Whitepapers
 Complex Scripts — Microsoft Global Development and Computing Portal
 Theppitak's Homepage — information about Thai language processing
 HarfBuzz's page at Freedesktop.org
 D-Type Unicode Text Module — Portable software library for complex text
 BidiRenderer — An application that illustrates the shaping and layout of complex text in bidirectional paragraphs using FriBidi, FreeType, and HarfBuzz
 Tehreer-Android — A library that gives full control over text related technologies such as bidirectional algorithm, open type shaping, text typesetting and text rendering
Tehreer-Cocoa — Standalone font/text engine for iOS

Typesetting
Indic computing
Natural language and computing